Brønnøysund Register Centre (Norwegian Bokmål: Brønnøysundregistrene; formal name Registerenheten i Brønnøysund, Norwegian Nynorsk: Brønnøysundregistra) is a Norwegian government agency that is responsible for the management of numerous public registers for Norway, and governmental systems for digital exchange of information. The agency maintains the Norwegian metadata repository SERES and ELMER, a standard for the design of web forms. The register gets its name from the town Brønnøysund in Nordland where it is located.

Most of the registers are related to commerce, but also personal registers are conducted by Brønnøysund. The register is part of the European Business Register and is led by Lars Peder Brekk. The registry is a subsidiary of the Norwegian Ministry of Trade and Industry.

Registers
Central Coordinating Register for Legal Entities
Register of Business Enterprises
Disqualified Directors Register
European Business Register
Eco-Management and Audit Scheme Register
Lottery Register
Register of Company Accounts
Register of the Reporting Obligations of Enterprises
Register of Mortgaged Moveable Property
Register of Bankruptcies

Register of Marriage Settlements
Register of Private Debt Amnesty
Register of Political Parties
Register of Non-profit Organizations
National Fee Collection Office
Norwegian Register of Hunters
Central Marketing Exclusion Register
Voluntary Register of Complementary Practitioners

See also
 List of company registers

External links
 Brønnøysund Register Centre

Government agencies of Norway
Brønnøy
Organisations based in Brønnøysund
Registrars of companies